This is a list of public art in Scottish Borders, one of the 32 local government council areas of Scotland. It borders the City of Edinburgh, Dumfries and Galloway, East Lothian, Midlothian, South Lanarkshire, West Lothian and, to the south, the English counties of Cumbria and Northumberland.  This list applies only to works of public art on permanent display in an outdoor public space and does not, for example, include artworks in museums.

Burnmouth

Coldstream

Cove

Duns

Earlston

Eyemouth

Galashiels

Hawick

Jedburgh

Kelso

Melrose

Minto

Peebles

St. Abbs

Selkirk

References

Scottish Borders
Public art
Outdoor sculptures in Scotland
Statues in Scotland